Sima Zhou (227 – 12 June 283), courtesy name Zijiang, was an imperial prince and military general of the Jin dynasty of China. He previously served in the state of Cao Wei during the Three Kingdoms period. His grandson, Sima Rui, was the founding emperor of the Eastern Jin dynasty.

Life in Cao Wei
Sima Zhou was born to Sima Yi and his concubine Lady Fu (伏氏); he was Lady Fu's second son. He had three full brothers: Sima Liang, Sima Jing (司馬京) and Sima Jun (司馬駿). He started his career as a military officer in the state of Cao Wei during the Three Kingdoms period. As a youth, he already had a reputation for his talent and also because of his family background; the Sima family had been the de facto rulers of Wei since 249. Sima Zhou was first appointed as Ningshuo General (寧朔將軍) and put in charge of the security of the Wei nobles living in Ye city. Sometime during the Zhengshi era (240–249) of Cao Fang's reign, he was enfeoffed as the Marquis of Nan'an Village (南安亭侯). Later, he was promoted to a Regular Mounted Attendant (散騎常侍) and elevated from a village marquis to a district marquis under the title "Marquis of Dongwu District" (東武鄉侯).

In 260, the Wei emperor Cao Mao attempted to seize back power from the Sima family by staging a coup d'état against the regent Sima Zhao (Sima Zhou's half-brother). Sima Zhou, then holding the position of a Colonel of the Garrison Cavalry (屯騎校尉), led his troops to stop Cao Mao. However, his men dispersed in fear when Cao Mao shouted at them. Cao Mao eventually met his end at the hands of Cheng Ji (成濟), a subordinate of Sima Zhao's adviser Jia Chong.

In 263, during the reign of Cao Huan, Sima Zhou was appointed as General of the Right (右將軍) and Inspector (刺史) of Yan Province. A year later, after Sima Zhao restored the five-rank nobility system, which had previously been abolished, Sima Zhou was enfeoffed as the Count of Nanpi (南皮伯). He was also reassigned to be General Who Attacks Barbarians (征虜將軍) and granted imperial authority.

Life under the Jin dynasty
On 8 February 266, a few months after Sima Zhao's death, his son Sima Yan (Emperor Wu) usurped the throne from Cao Huan and established the Jin dynasty (266–420) to replace the Cao Wei state, with himself as the new emperor. The day after his coronation, Emperor Wu enfeoffed his uncle Sima Zhou as the Prince of Dongguan (東莞王) with a princedom comprising 10,600 taxable households. He also granted permission to all the princes to appoint the county prefects/chiefs in the counties in their princedoms. Sima Zhou tried to ask Emperor Wu to remove this privilege but the emperor refused.

In 268, Emperor Wu appointed Sima Zhou as Right Supervisor of the Masters of Writing (尚書右僕射) and General Who Pacifies the Army (撫軍將軍). In the following year, he reassigned Sima Zhou to be Senior General Who Guards the East (鎮東大將軍) and granted him imperial authority to replace Wei Guan in supervising military affairs in Xu Province. During his tenure, Sima Zhou instilled good discipline among the troops and earned much respect from them. The military leaders in the Jin dynasty's rival state, Eastern Wu, were very wary of him.

On 5 October 277, Emperor Wu heeded a suggestion by the minister Yang Yao (楊珧) and started reshuffling the various princes and their princedoms. As Sima Zhou was in Xu Province at the time, Emperor Wu enfeoffed him as the Prince of Langya (琅邪王) while at the same time allowing him to retain his original princedom in Dongguan; Sima Zhou's princedom thus comprised both the commanderies of Dongguan and Langya.

In 279, Sima Zhou participated in the Jin dynasty's campaign against Eastern Wu and led thousands of troops to attack the Wu position at Tuzhong (塗中). In 280, Sun Hao, the last Wu emperor, surrendered to the Jin dynasty. China was thus reunified under the Jin dynasty's rule. As a reward for Sima Zhou's contributions during the campaign, Emperor Wu enfeoffed two of Sima Zhou's sons as village marquises, each with a marquisate comprising 3,000 taxable households, in addition to granting him 6,000 rolls of silk. Some months later, Sima Zhou was reassigned to supervise military affairs in Qing Province and was given an additional appointment as a Palace Attendant (侍中). He was subsequently promoted to General-in-Chief (大將軍) and allowed to set up his own administrative office.

When Sima Zhou became critically ill in 283, Emperor Wu bestowed several gifts on his family and even sent officials to visit him and enquire about his condition. Sima Zhou eventually died that year at the age of 57 (by East Asian age reckoning). Emperor Wu honoured him with the posthumous title "Prince Wu" (武王). Before his death, Sima Zhou had requested to be buried beside his mother Lady Fu after his death and for his princedom to be divided among his four sons: Sima Jin (司馬覲), Sima Dan (司馬澹), Sima Yao (司馬繇) and Sima Cui (司馬漼). Emperor Wu approved his request. Among Sima Zhou's four sons, the eldest, Sima Jin, inherited his father's peerage as the Prince of Langya.

See also
 Lists of people of the Three Kingdoms

References

 Chen, Shou (3rd century). Records of the Three Kingdoms (Sanguozhi).
 Fang, Xuanling (ed.) (648). Book of Jin (Jin Shu).
 Pei, Songzhi (5th century). Annotations to Records of the Three Kingdoms (Sanguozhi zhu).
 Sima, Guang (1084). Zizhi Tongjian.

227 births
283 deaths
Cao Wei politicians
Jin dynasty (266–420) imperial princes
Jin dynasty (266–420) generals
Jin dynasty (266–420) politicians